Elizabeth Marguerita Mary Kershaw (born 30 July 1958) is an English radio broadcaster. She is the second longest serving female national radio DJ in the UK (after Annie Nightingale), celebrating 30 years on national BBC Radio in 2017.

Career
After graduating from the University of Leeds, Liz Kershaw began her media career in Leeds with a music column in the Yorkshire Post. Her brother is fellow broadcaster Andy Kershaw. Her first radio show was in 1981 on Radio Aire where her brother worked for a time. In 1985 she moved to BBC Radio Leeds to present a weekly rock show showcasing local bands.

In 1986 her day job with British Telecom saw her move to London to set up "Livewire" a dial-in pop service which superseded Dial-a-Disc. In running this she produced Radio 1 DJs Mike Smith, Janice Long and Dave Pearce before devising her own show for Radio 1 in 1987, Backchat, which won several awards.

This was followed by her presenting the Radio 1 Evening Show and then, with Bruno Brookes, Radio 1's Weekend Breakfast Show and the Radio 1 Roadshow from 1989 to 1992. The two DJs projected a 'love-hate' relationship on-air, and got their fair share of PR in the tabloids, including Kershaw's smashing up of a Wet Wet Wet record, and the studio turntable under it, live on air (for which she was fined £1,000 by the BBC) because she hated the band for disappointing their fans by not turning up at the Radio 1 Roadshow; and the two pulling a stunt of getting married as an April Fools' Day joke. During this period they also made three charity records for the BBC's Children in Need campaign; a version of "It Takes Two" which charted at No. 53 and two more records featuring their Radio 1 colleagues and guests Status Quo, Frank Bruno and Samantha Fox.

She left Radio 1 in 1992 to present The Crunch, the UK's first national daily phone-in on BBC Radio 5.
Also in 1992, she was gunged on Noel's House Party.

In 1994 she was part of the team which relaunched the station as BBC Radio 5 Live. In 2000 she went back to BBC Local Radio as the first and only woman in the country to present a solo radio breakfast show. This was BBC Radio Northampton's breakfast programme, which was nominated for the Best Breakfast Show Award at the Sony Radio Awards in 2002 along with Radio 4's Today Programme and the 5 Live Breakfast Show. She also presented documentaries for Radio 1, Radio 2, Radio 3 and Radio 4.

Dawn Chorus and the Blue Tits 
In 1984 Kershaw formed a band called Dawn Chorus and the Blue Tits with her friend and neighbour Countdown presenter Carol Vorderman. Their recordings included a version of "Teenage Kicks" with the Undertones' O'Neill brothers (John and Damian), which was released on Stiff Records' DAWN 1. and a Peel Session which was broadcast on Radio 1 in 1985.

Recent career
In 2002, she was one of the original presenters on the digital station BBC Radio 6 Music where she presented the weekday afternoon show from 1.00pm-4.00pm, before moving to the weekend mid-morning slots in April 2004, from 10.00am-1.00pm.

In September 2005 Kershaw became a weekday presenter on the BBC's BBC Coventry & Warwickshire radio station, where she took over the Drivetime show. She later presented the weekday Breakfast Show for the station and continued to present a show on BBC Radio 6 Music, but on Saturdays only. Kershaw and Bruno Brookes re-united for a one-off special on BBC Coventry and Warwickshire on Christmas morning in 2006.

In July 2007, following a complaint from Buckingham Palace about the misrepresentation of the Queen in a BBC documentary, Mark Thompson, then-Director-General of the BBC, in a public purging exercise, singled out Kershaw's show in what became an infamous BBC scandal, announcing that some of the DJ's shows that were aired as live were in fact pre-recorded and that members of the production team had passed themselves off as listeners texting and emailing into competitions.

It was subsequently revealed by journalists and listeners that other shows presented by Russell Brand, Jo Whiley, Tony Blackburn and Dermot O'Leary were also involved in the same endemic production practices.

On 30 July 2008, the BBC was accused by media watchdog Ofcom of 'misleading its audiences' by 'faking' audience interaction. Ofcom stated that the BBC 'deceived its audience by faking winners of competitions and deliberately conducting competitions unfairly and fined the corporation a record £400,000 of which Kershaw's BBC Radio 6 Music show was fined £115,000 for seventeen shows in 2005 and 2006. Kershaw was forbidden from commenting on this by a clause in her contract which prevented her from speaking publicly about the BBC and its affairs.

Until June 2022, she could be heard on BBC Radio 6 Music Sunday lunchtimes 1.00pm-2.00pm. She left the breakfast show at BBC Coventry & Warwickshire on Friday 17 July 2009 when the management decided to change the hosts, moving to a Sunday programme which she presented until April 2011. On 2 October 2010, she reprised her performance of the Undertones' "Teenage Kicks" at the celebration of the reprieve of BBC Radio 6 Music, 6 Fest with Damian O'Neill of the Undertones and Doyle & the Fourfathers, a charity gig in aid of Nordoff-Robbins and the Chilean miners in the 2010 Copiapó mining accident.

In October 2012, Kershaw told the BBC Radio 4 Today programme that she had been routinely groped while working as a Radio1 DJ in the 1980s. She said the station had a culture that was very intimidating for a young woman. 

In November 2012, Kershaw was named in a case involving the suicide of BBC journalist Russell Joslin, who had alleged that Kershaw had sexually harassed him.

In 2014, she released her autobiography, The Bird and the Beeb.

In 2020, she criticised UK government period poverty measures and expressed support for the use of "old rags" as sanitary products.

References

External links

1958 births
British Telecom people
Living people
English radio DJs
BBC Radio 1 presenters
People from Littleborough, Greater Manchester
Alumni of the University of Leeds
BBC Radio 6 Music presenters